Minneota can refer to a community in the United States:
 Minneota, Minnesota
 Minneota Township, Jackson County, Minnesota